Mahasoabe is a municipality in Madagascar. It belongs to the district of Vohipeno, which is a part of Fitovinany. The population of the commune was estimated to be approximately 7,000 in 2001 commune census.

Only primary schooling is available. The majority 90% of the population of the commune are farmers, while an additional 2% receives their livelihood from raising livestock. The most important crop is coffee, while other important products are sugarcane, cassava and rice. Services provide employment for 1% of the population. Additionally fishing employs 7% of the population.

References

Populated places in Fitovinany